The 2008 ICC Under-19 Cricket World Cup was held in Malaysia from 17 February 2008 to 2 March 2008. The opening ceremony took place on 15 February 2008. The final was played between South Africa and India, which India won by 12 runs on the Duckworth–Lewis method.

Venues
The matches took place at three locations: Kuala Lumpur, Johor and Penang. The venues used were:

Kuala Lumpur
Kinrara Academy Oval
Royal Selangor Club Bukit Kiara
Bayuemas Oval

Johor
Johor Cricket Academy
Maktab Perguruan Temenggong Ibrahim

Penang
Penang Sports Club
Universiti Sains Malaysia

Squads

Groups

The league stage of the tournament consisted of four groups of four teams each. Each team would play once with every team in the group. The groups would be stationed at their respective venues for the group stage. The figures in brackets indicate respective seedings.

Group stage

Group A

All matches start at 0200 UTC.

Group B

All matches started at 0200 UTC.

Group C

All matches start at 0200 UTC.

Group D

All matches start at 0200 UTC.

Quarter-finals

Super Quarter-finals

Plate Quarter-finals

Semi-finals

Super Semi-finals

5th Place Semi-Finals

Plate Semi-finals

13th place Semi-finals

Finals

13th Place Final

Plate Final

Fifth-place final

Final

Final standings

External links
Official Site

ICC Under-19 Cricket World Cup
Icc Under-19 Cricket World Cup, 2008
International cricket competitions in Malaysia